Jun Hyun-moo (born November 7, 1977) is a South Korean host and television personality. Before becoming a host, he was a news anchor and radio announcer.

Education
Jeon graduated from Yonsei University with a degree in Sociology and English Literature.

Philanthropy 
Jun also donated 100 million won to single mothers in 2018 and joined the Seoul Fruit of Love Honor Society.

In 2019, Jun donated 50 million won to help victims of the Gangwon wildfires and in 2020 he donated 100 million won to low-income families struggling with COVID-19.  He also donated 10 million won to teenagers to help them generate self-sufficiency through the 'Free Market'.

On March 7, 2022, Jun donated 100 million won to support emergency relief for forest fire victims through the Seoul Social Welfare Community Team (hereinafter referred to as the fruit of love).

Filmography

Television shows

Current

Former Shows

Television Series

Hosting

Web shows

Awards

Listicles

References

External links 

 

South Korean television presenters
South Korean announcers
SM Entertainment artists
Yonsei University alumni
People from Seoul
1977 births
Living people
South Korean journalists
Best Variety Performer Male Paeksang Arts Award (television) winners